Ljoljići is a village in the municipality of Jezero, Bosnia and Herzegovina. Prior to the 1992-95 war, it lay within the municipality of Jajce.

References

Populated places in Jezero, Bosnia and Herzegovina